Finding Santa (also known as Get Santa) is a 2016 Danish stop motion Christmas fantasy film directed by Jacob Ley and written by Ley and .

Premise 
Julius, an orphan, loves Christmas, and secretly owns a box of Christmas items. One day, the box magically swallows Julius and takes him to a wintery world called Winterland, where all the figures from his box have come to life. There, they tell him that Santa has been missing for some time and that the power in Winterland has been taken over by the evil Krampus, and it is up to Julius to help them save Christmas.

Voice cast 
  as Julius
 Rasmus Bjerg as Krampus 
  as Santa Claus
  as Gregers
 Bodil Jørgensen as Inger
 Lars Hjortshøj as Herman 
 Maria Lucia Rosenberg as Såfina
 Uffe Ellemann-Jensen as Poul
  as Piv 
  as Sofie

References

External links 

2016 films
Danish animated fantasy films
2010s fantasy adventure films
2010s Christmas films